Acanthus or Akanthos, also called Dulopolis or Doulopolis (Δουλόπολις), was a town of ancient Caria in the region of Bybassus.

Its site is unlocated.

References

Populated places in ancient Caria
Former populated places in Turkey
Lost ancient cities and towns